Superman/Batman is a monthly comic book series published by DC Comics that features the publisher's two most popular superheroes: Superman and Batman. Superman/Batman premiered in August 2003, an update of the previous series, World's Finest Comics, in which Superman and Batman regularly joined forces.

Superman/Batman explores the camaraderie, antagonism, and friendship between its title characters. Jeph Loeb, the series' first writer, introduced a dual-narrator technique to present the characters' often opposing viewpoints and estimations of each other, which subsequent series writers have maintained. Before the 1985 limited series Crisis on Infinite Earths, the two iconic characters were depicted as the best of friends. Frank Miller's landmark series The Dark Knight Returns was the first DC story that depicts the heroes at odds with each other, as opposed to Pre-Crisis incarnations. This dynamic became DC Universe canon with John Byrne's The Man of Steel, a Superman reboot published in 1986.

After the first 13 issues, most of the story arcs were independent and self-contained from the ongoing or crossover storylines in the other Batman and Superman comic titles. Superman/Batman #26, Loeb's final issue, features a story plotted by Loeb's son, Sam Loeb, who wrote it before his death from cancer in 2005 at the age of 17. Twenty-six writers and artists who knew Sam worked on the issue, donating their fees and royalties for the issue to the Sam Loeb College Scholarship Fund.

As part of The New 52, a series titled Batman/Superman was released from 2013 to 2016. A second Batman/Superman series was released in August 2019, with issue #16 as part of DC's Infinite Frontier.

A new ongoing series by Mark Waid titled Batman/Superman: World's Finest was released in March 2022.

Superman/Batman (2003-2011)

Jeph Loeb
Loeb, who wrote Superman for two years before the launch of the title, wrote the book for the first two years of its publication. Unlike later writers, Loeb's work on the book lasted for several storylines, which were interconnected.

In the first story arc, "The World's Finest", also referred to as "Public Enemies" (issues #1–6, illustrated by Ed McGuinness), then-U.S. President Lex Luthor declares Superman and Batman enemies of the state, claiming that a Kryptonite asteroid headed for Earth is connected to an evil plot by Superman. Luthor offers a $1,000,000,000 bounty, which encourages both supervillains and superheroes to attack. Superman almost kills Lex, with Batman standing aside. Superman changes his mind at the last moment. The new Toyman, Hiro Okamura, assists with the asteroid's destruction. Captain Atom is seemingly killed. The danger averted and Luthor's plans in jeopardy, Luthor injects himself with a mixture of Venom and synthetic Kryptonite, dons a battle suit from the planet Apokolips, and confronts Batman and Superman. Luthor is defeated and appears to die in the battle, although he is shown to survive. In the course of the fight, Luthor is irrevocably exposed to the world as a villain for the first time in Post-Crisis continuity. Losing the presidency, Luthor is succeeded in office by Pete Ross.

In "Protégé" (issue #7, illustrated by Pat Lee), Superboy and Robin investigate the new Toyman for their mentors.

In "The Supergirl from Krypton" (issues #8–13, illustrated by Michael Turner), the Kryptonite asteroid is revealed to hold a pod that contains Superman's cousin Kara Zor-El. Batman says her arrival is too coincidental. Wonder Woman abducts Kara to Themyscira to train her for combat. Darkseid kidnaps Kara, intending her to be the new leader of the Female Furies. She is rescued from Darkseid and taken back to Earth. The villain follows, seemingly killing Kara at the home of Jonathan and Martha Kent. An enraged Superman throws Darkseid into the reality-spanning Source Wall, entrapping him. However, Kara is back in Themyscira and is introduced to the world as Supergirl. This story arc marked the only time in the late artist Michael Turner's career that he provided interior art for a company other than Top Cow Productions or his own publisher, Aspen MLT. The story was dedicated to Christopher Reeve, who died during the year the storyline ended.

In "Absolute Power" (issues #14–18, illustrated by Carlos Pacheco), Lightning Lord, Saturn Queen, and Cosmic King—three supervillains from the 31st century—eliminate members of the Justice League of America, except for young Superman and Batman, whom they raise as their own children. Batman and Superman are raised to be dictators of the world, eliminating all opposition and killing people who would otherwise be their friends. During a fight with Wonder Woman and the Freedom Fighters, as Uncle Sam has been given Hal Jordan's power ring, during which Batman is killed but Superman is able to kill Diana with her lasso, the timeline is thrown into chaos, and the two men travel through alternate timelines. Darkseid makes a deal with them in one reality to send them back through time to stop the supervillains who raised them from altering history. When trying to change Batman's history back, Batman breaks down and shoots Joe Chill – the killer of Thomas Wayne and Martha Wayne. The Legion then team up with Ra's al Ghul to take over the world. Superman and Batman restore history, but the murders they committed haunt them.

Issue #19 (illustrated by Ian Churchill) is a stand-alone backdoor pilot story for the Supergirl series. The issue was later reprinted as Supergirl #0.

In "With a Vengeance!" (issues #20–25, illustrated by Ed McGuiness), Mister Mxyzptlk battles the Joker, who has tricked Bat-Mite out of his powers, using other characters as their pawns. Superman and Batman fight a team of superheroes from an alternate universe called the Maximums (a pastiche of Marvel Comics' Avengers series, more specifically their incarnations from the Ultimate universe, the Ultimates). Keeping the bargain he made in "Absolute Power", Superman frees Darkseid from the Source Wall. Double-crossed, Superman becomes stuck in the wall himself. Bizarro and multiple Supergirls rescue him. Everyone so far and many more other duplicates fight in an arena before Bat-Mite escapes. The two imps tie up all loose ends with their cosmic powers. Additionally, Superman, Batman and the Toyman discover that Captain Atom is alive.

"Who Would Win?" (issue #78)

Sam Loeb
Before he finished writing Superman/Batman #26, Jeph Loeb's son, Sam, died on June 17, 2005, at the age of 17, after a three-year battle with cancer. The issue was supposed to be Sam's DC writing debut and was to be illustrated by Pat Lee. Jeph, along with 25 other comic book professionals and artists who had known Sam, worked on the issue, scripting or penciling individual pages. Marvel Comics allowed John Cassaday and Joss Whedon to work on the issue, despite their exclusive contracts. All 26 contributors donated their fees and royalties for the issue to the Sam Loeb College Scholarship Fund.

In "The Boys Are Back in Town" (issue #26), Superman and Batman send Superboy and Robin to visit the Toyman in Japan because he has not been heard from in a while. The issue was released shortly after Superboy's death in Infinite Crisis #6, and Robin's eulogy of Superboy serves as both a framing sequence and as a meditation on the author's passing.

The 26 contributors to the issue:

"Sam's Story", a back-up story written by Jeph Loeb 10 days after his son's death, depicts young Clark Kent's friendship with a boy named Sam who gets cancer. Tim Sale provides the art for the story in a style reminiscent of the Superman for All Seasons miniseries.

Mark Verheiden
Superman writer and Smallville producer Mark Verheiden took over Superman/Batman with issue #27.

In "Never Mind" (issue #27, illustrated by Kevin Maguire), The Superman and Batman of Earth-Two discover that their minds have been transferred by the Ultra-Humanite and the original Brainwave into the bodies of Power Girl (Superman's cousin) and the Huntress (Batman's daughter). If they cannot reverse the process in time, the women's personalities will soon reassert themselves and destroy the men's consciousness, killing them.

In "The Enemies Among Us" (issues #28–33, illustrated by Ethan Van Sciver for Parts 1–3, with Matthew Clark picking up Parts 4–5 and Joe Benitez concluding with Part 6), Superman, Martian Manhunter and other alien superheroes are being controlled by an entity known as Blackrock, which later infects Batman when he takes the rock to successfully stand up to Superman. After Superman visits Lois Lane to be reminded why he fights for Earth, he is able to force Blackrock to leave Batman by convincing it that he will kill his friend to spare him being used by the rock. Tracking Blackrock to its source, they discover that it was actually being 'led' by Despero, who convinced an alien race that Earth was not worth saving by giving them access to Superman's mind during a period of self-doubt. Challenging the aliens to read his mind again, Superman convinces them that they were wrong about Earth.

In "A.I." (issues #34–36, illustrated by Pat Lee), Superman and Batman are introduced to Will Magnus and his malleable, shape-shifting Metal Men for the first time (in Post-Infinite Crisis continuity). Bruce Wayne hires the Metal Men as security guards. They go on a rampage and steal a prototype OMAC unit.

Alan Burnett
Known for his work on the DC Animated Universe and The Batman television series, Alan Burnett took over as writer of the series with issue #37.

In "Torment" (issues #37-42, illustrated by Dustin Nguyen), Superman is psychologically tortured by the Scarecrow and brought to the war planet Tartaros by DeSaad. DeSaad plants a mind-controlling spike in Superman's head, and sends him to retrieve Highfather's staff from the Source Wall, which Darkseid plans to use to restore his powers, which have been steadily waning since his escape from the wall. Batman comes after Superman, but is sidetracked by Orion's wife Bekka. Both are unable to control their attraction to one another. Superman retrieves the staff, but is trapped in the Source Wall as a result. Batman and Bekka take advantage of DeSaad's attempted betrayal of Darkseid to steal the staff and bring back Superman. Darkseid and DeSaad flee, and Tartarus is pulled into the hole Superman made in the Source Wall when he escaped. Superman, Batman and Bekka return to Earth, bringing Scarecrow with them. Bekka is retrieved by Orion, and is later seen being killed by a shadowy assailant.

Dan Abnett and Andy Lanning
The team of Dan Abnett and Andy Lanning filled in for issue #43, and later wrote off of scripts from Mike Johnson for issues #57–59.

In "Darklight" (issue #43, illustrated by Mike McKone), Doctor Light infiltrates a dark matter fuel experiment on a Waynetech satellite, by creating solidgram versions of the original Teen Titans to distract the guards. He then uses the experiment's Kryptonian processor to enter the Fortress of Solitude. While Superman battles the Titan solidgrams, Batman manages to head off and defeat Light by trapping him in a Dark Matter crystal. Light is later freed by Lex Luthor, who wants him to join his new Injustice League.

In "Nanopolis" (issues #57–59), the Prankster tricks Superman and shrinks him to microscopic size. Batman must find him and return him to normal size. Before returning to normal, the two heroes must rescue the microscopic civilization whose existence has been inadvertently endangered by the Prankster.

Mike Johnson and Michael Green
As of issue #46, Mike Johnson joined with Michael Green to continue the series; issue #44 was the beginning of the new run. They are the first writers to hold regular roles on this series since Jeph Loeb.

In "K" (issues #44-49, illustrated by Shane Davis), Superman and Batman began a mission to collect and rid the Earth of every piece of Kryptonite, a substance lethal to Superman, which has been in great abundance since Kara's arrival earlier in this series. Along the way, Batman and Superman receive a lot of support from other heroes, including Firestorm, looking for membership in the JLA. They surprisingly also encounter some resistance, especially from the new Aquaman. This story also includes the reveal of two new variations of Kryptonite that have been also enhanced by a magical charm. One causes Superman to feel like a child and carefree for the day, which also has implications of a drug-like effect, while the second restores him to normal. As they continue to search, they encounter the Last Line, a team run by Amanda Waller and a new Kryptonite-powered version of Doomsday created by Waller. In the end, Superman decides to give Batman the last piece of Kryptonite, because he feels he needs his weakness to be human and also in case he goes rogue. After he flies away, the Caped Crusader retreats to the Batcave, where it is revealed that a sample of each Kryptonite variation, along with large chunks of green Kryptonite, are still kept there.

In "The Fathers" (issue #50), while rebuilding Smallville following the events of "K", Superman and Batman uncover a piece of Kryptonian technology that reveals that Jor-El came in contact with Thomas Wayne while searching for an appropriate planet to serve as baby Kal-El's new home. It is revealed that Jor-El was initially hesitant to send Kal-El to Earth until his meeting with Thomas Wayne convinced him otherwise.

In "Lil' Leaguers" (issues #51–52), Superman, Batman and the Justice League of America face miniature versions of themselves. These Lil' Leaguers are childlike versions of the heroes and have similar powers. They face off against the Lil' Villains, and learn the harsh truth that the world is a very dangerous place when Lil' Superman is killed by a Father Box-enhanced Lil' Doomsday.

In "Super/Bat" (issues #53–56), Johnson and Green are joined by Rags Morales for a story about Superman's powers being transferred to Batman during a battle with the Silver Banshee. Batman revels in his new powers and uses them to bring complete fear and order to Gotham's criminal underworld and eventually sets his sight on the rest of the world. Superman meanwhile, tries to lead a normal life as a husband and journalist. Their allies realized that the power switch has a psychological side effect to both men, as Batman's behavior becomes increasingly aggressive and Superman himself becomes emotionally depressed despite living the life he has always wanted, realizing that the transfer was the result of a curse that would give each man what they had always wanted, while simultaneously rendering them incapable of using it properly. With the aid of the Justice League, The Man of Steel was able to bring himself and the Dark Knight back to normal.

In "Mash-Up" (issues #60–61), Superman and Batman meet the Justice Titans in Gothamopolis and together they must take down the city's worst villains. Francis Manapul is on covers and interiors for this two-parter.

In "Sidekicked" (issue #62, illustrated by Rafael Albuquerque), Supergirl and Robin (Tim Drake) reminisce about their first mission as a team: a hostage crisis at Arkham Asylum. The inmates they confront include the Joker, the Scarecrow, Two-Face, Clayface, the Mad Hatter, Killer Croc, Poison Ivy and Victor Zsasz.

In "Night and Day" (issue #63, illustrated by Rafael Albuquerque), Superman is forced to flee Earth when Gorilla Grodd succeeds in filling the planet's atmosphere with Kryptonite. Subsequently, Grodd conquers Earth, having used his mental abilities to control the minds of every remaining inhabitant of the planet except Batman, who resists using his mental discipline. This is broken when Alfred Pennyworth dies enabling Grodd to capture him. At Batman's execution Superman returns, now immune to the artificial Kryptonite released by Grodd thanks to Batman, and defeats the villain. However, this entire scenario is revealad to be a simulation created in the Batcomputer.

Joe Kelly
So far, Joe Kelly's work on the series has been exclusive to two Annuals. Both released stories have been reinterpretations of stories originally published during the Silver Age.

In "Stop Me If You've Heard This One..." (Annual #1, illustrated by Ed McGuinness, (2006)), Clark Kent and Bruce Wayne both end up on a cruise together along with Lois Lane. Along the way, they encounter Deathstroke the Terminator (Slade Wilson), as well as the Crime Syndicate from the Antimatter Universe, which is made up of evil duplicates of the heroes. The members they face are Ultraman (Superman), Owlman (Batman), and Superwoman (Wonder Woman), who is Lois Lane in the Antimatter Universe. An alternate, unnamed version of Deathstroke also appears, characterized very similarly to Marvel Comics' Deadpool. During the course of the adventure, Superman and Batman discover each other's secret identities and agree to work together, even though they disagree with each other's methods of operating. The issue is a reimagining of "The Mightiest Team In the World", the tale from Superman #76 (May–June 1952) in which the two heroes discover each other's secret identities and team up for the first time.

In "The Unexamined Life... " (Annual #2 (2008)), Superman loses his powers and takes on the identity of Supernova. The issue is a reimagining of "The Has-Been Superman" from World's Finest Comics #178 (September 1968) and "Superman's Perfect Crime" from World's Finest Comics #180 (November 1968). This story takes place early in the career of the original Robin and depicts his first meeting with Superman.

Len Wein
So far, Len Wein's work has been exclusive to the third installment of the Annuals. This annual follows the trend set by Joe Kelly's work, reimagining another Silver Age tale.

In "Compound Fracture" (Annual #3 (2009)), Superman and Batman encounter the Composite Superman, a failed experiment of Professor Ivo with all the powers of the Justice League of America. The issue is a reimagining of "The Composite Superman", the tale from World's Finest Comics #142 (June 1964) where Superman, Batman and Robin must battle a new villain with all the powers of the Legion of Super-Heroes.

Joe Casey
In "Prelude to the Big Noise" (issue #64), Batman discovers information on Superman's Kryptonian origins that place the two in danger unless Superman is willing to sacrifice himself.

"The Big Noise" (issues #68–71)(issues #68–70 were illustrated by Ardian Syaf)
Originally, "The Big Noise" was intended to relaunch the book as a flashback series dealing with the aftermath of various DC crossovers, but Casey's original scripts were devoid of references to the crossovers, scrapping the plan for future stories in the intended vein.

Peter Johnson and Matt Cherniss
"Sweet Dreams" ( issue #65) is a special Halloween issue showing what scares Superman and Batman, and also exposing the inner fears of Joker and Lex Luthor.
This is revealed as an induced dream created by the Scarecrow who had captured them, but Batman is able to free himself and defeat the villain.

Scott Kolins
Scott Kolins wrote "Night of the Cure" (issues #66–67) as a special Blackest Night tie-in starring Bizarro and the Man-Bat.

Paul Levitz
"Worship" (#72–74)
Paul Levitz wrote the lead story in issue #75, the anniversary issue, guest-starring the Legion of Super-Heroes. In addition, this issue featured an all-star lineup, including Steven T. Seagle, William Tucci, Adam Hughes, J. T. Krul, and David Finch.

"A Time Beyond Hope" (Annual #4 (2010))

Judd Winick
Judd Winick wrote "The Brave and the Bold" (issue #76).
Following Bruce Wayne's death during Final Crisis, Superman has trouble coping with his friend's death, even informing Dick Grayson that he is essentially wearing Bruce's skin by dressing as Batman, but a conversation with Wonder Woman allows Clark to accept what has happened to his friend and acknowledge Grayson as the new Batman.

Joshua Williamson 
Joshua Williamson wrote "Fright Night" (issue #77). After a shallow grave is discovered in Metropolis, Supergirl tries to get the help of Batman to investigate, but ends up only finding the current Robin Damian Wayne, Even not doing well, they discover that the victims are killed by a sudden heart attack and all of them are employers of LexCorp. While infiltrating a party with another members, Supergirl finds the culprit to be The Scarecrow who wants revenge on Lex Luthor since the latter stole his Sinestro Corps power ring from him. He then uses a concentrated version of the fear gas to make Supergirl hallucinate, but Robin manages to calm her down and the duo arrest Scarecrow.

Chris Roberson
Chris Roberson wrote "Worlds' Finest" (issues #79–80).
Coming directly from the DC One Million storyline, Epoch The Lord of Time arrives in the 853rd century trying to conquering it and is quickly subdued by the Superman and Batman versions of that time. However, he reveals this all to be just a plan to get access to the Batcave and a powerful armor he uses to trap One Million Superman and Batman in an eternal time loop before going back and ends up battling Superman, Batman and Robin from the 21st century. Epoch again gains the upper hand by trapping the three inside an impenetrable barrier, but the heroes free themselves using their science skills as Superman breaks his time travel device, sending the villain randomly through time back to the 853rd century, where he is finally arrested by the Superman and Batman from that time.

Cullen Bunn
Cullen Bunn wrote "Sorcerer Kings" (issues #81–84).
Phantom Stranger warns the Shadowpact about an upcoming magical threat. When they get to the appointed location, dozens of demons arise, followed by a silver-armored knight who fights them; after he is killed, the knight is revealed to be Superman. When the real Superman is informed, an alternative Batman appears and abducts him; meanwhile, the real Batman is working together with Detective Chimp, Doctor Occult and Klarion the Witch Boy to find the demons' source. The strange Batman takes Superman to his world of origin - a possible future where the world was cursed in a spell summoned by the Coven, a group composed of Felix Faust, Morgan Le Fey, Brother Blood and Blackbriar Thorn. The future Batman reveals that the Coven plan to send a powerful monster through time to assure their victory in the past.

James Robinson
"Reign of Doomsday" (Annual #5 (2011)), "Reign of Doomsday – Part Five: No Exit!", picks up where Justice League of America (vol. 2) #55 left off and continues the "Reign of Doomsday" storyline. Supergirl and Batman (Dick Grayson) are trapped on the Justice League satellite with the Cyborg Superman and Doomsday, who are attempting to tear each other apart, and ends with Doomsday beating and taking both Supergirl and the Cyborg. The story continues in Superboy (vol. 4) #6.

Joshua Hale Fialkov
Joshua Hale Fialkov wrote "The Secret" (issues #85–87). When the body of Garret Remington, a young journalist and friend of Perry White, is found in Metropolis, Clark Kent is assigned to the story. Somehow, Remington discovered Gotham City's greatest mystery: the identity of Batman.  Batman warns Clark to stay away, especially after Clark finds Garret's original clue, a Batgadget with a Wayne Enterprises serial number that was left on by an inexperienced Batman. Batman's own investigation reveals the murder culprit to be the Joker, who attacks Clark for continuing Garret's story.  Batman intervenes to protect Clark's secret identity. After apprehending Joker, Superman and Batman confront Martin Mayne, Garret Remington's boss, with the knowledge that he is the one who gave the tip to Joker in order to increase his newspaper's sales. Although the duo do not have enough evidence for a conviction, they reveal that Bruce Wayne had bought the journal and fired him. The series ends with a frank discussion between Batman and Superman about their respective roles as heroes.

Batman/Superman (2013–2016)
In September 2011, The New 52 rebooted DC's continuity. In June 2013, a new series titled Batman/Superman began publication, featuring the story of the first encounter between the two heroes as they exist in this continuity. The series was originally written by Greg Pak and illustrated by Jae Lee. This first arc is set before the formation of the Justice League, shown in 2011 in that team's own book. Greg Pak did the writing for issue #1–9, #11–27 and #3.1, Annuals #1–2 and Futures End #1. Artwork for issues #5–7 was done by Brent Booth. Artwork for issues #8–9 and #12–15 was done by Jae Lee. Issue #10 was written by Jeff Lemire and illustrated by Karl Kerschl and Scott Hepburn. Artwork for issue #11 was done by Karl Kerschl, Tom Derenick and Daniel Sampere. Artwork for Annual #1 was done by Jae Lee, Kenneth Rocafort, and Philip Tan. Artwork for Annual #2 was done by Tom Derenick Ian Churchill, Tyler Kirkham, Ardian Syaf, Emanuela Lupacchino. Artwork for issues #16-24 and 26 was done by Ardian Syaf. Artwork for issue #25 was done by Cliff Richards. Batman/Superman #28–30 were written by Tom Taylor and Robson Rocha. Due to the end of the New 52 imprint, the Batman/Superman series ended at issue #32 in May 2016. Previously unreleased issues #33, 34 and Annual #3 were published in the collection Volume 6: Universe's Finest in 2017.

Batman/Superman (2019–2021)
A second Batman/Superman series was announced by DC Comics in April 2019 and was released in August 2019, written by Joshua Williamson and art by David Marquez.  Gene Luen Yang and Ivan Reis took over the series on issue #16, with the series ending its run in September 2021 on issue #22.

Batman/Superman: World's Finest (2022–present)
In March 2022, DC Comics released Batman/Superman: World's Finest, a new comic series by writer Mark Waid and artist Dan Mora. The series is set in the "not-too-distant past".

Sales history
The first issue of Superman/Batman was ranked 3rd in August 2003, with pre-order sales of 134,135. Marvel 1602 #1 and Batman #618 were ranked 1st and 2nd, respectively, for that period. Superman/Batman #11 was the highest selling comic for July 2004, with pre-order sales of 143,712.

Collected editions
This series has been collected in the following formats:

Other collected editions
 Supergirl Vol. 1: Power: includes Superman/Batman #19
 Supergirl Vol. 2: Candor: includes Superman/Batman #27
 Superman: Return of Doomsday: includes Superman/Batman Annual #5
 Superman/Batman: The Greatest Stories Ever Told: includes Superman/Batman Secret Files and Origins 2003 and Superman/Batman Annual #1
 DC Essentials: Superman/Batman #1 (2016-01-20): includes Superman/Batman #1

In other media
 In 2002, The Batman/Superman Movie was released on DVD. This was actually a compilation of the three episodes from the "World's Finest" story arc of Season 2 of Superman: The Animated Series (1997) combined into a feature film.
 In 2004, a fan film for World's Finest was released.
 In the 2009 direct-to-video animated film Superman/Batman: Public Enemies (an adaptation of "World's Finest", the opening story arc of Superman/Batman), the Man of Steel and the Dark Knight team up to prevent a kryptonite meteoroid from striking Earth and to take down Lex Luthor, who has been elected President of the United States and has framed Superman for murder. DCAU cast members Kevin Conroy, Tim Daly, Clancy Brown and CCH Pounder reprised their respective roles as Batman, Superman, Luthor and Amanda Waller. Additionally, Allison Mack (Chloe Sullivan from the television series Smallville) voiced the role of Power Girl.
 In 2010, a sequel was released titled Superman/Batman: Apocalypse which is an adaptation of Jeph Loeb and Michael Turner's second story arc, "The Supergirl from Krypton". DCAU cast members Kevin Conroy, Tim Daly, Susan Eisenberg, and Edward Asner reprised their respective roles as Batman, Superman, Wonder Woman and Granny Goodness.  Additionally, Summer Glau (from the television series Firefly) voiced the role of Supergirl and Andre Braugher (from the television series Homicide: Life on the Street) portrayed Darkseid.
 At the 2013 San Diego Comic-Con Zack Snyder, director of Man of Steel, confirmed an upcoming sequel for Man of Steel, titled Batman v Superman: Dawn of Justice; the movie was originally slated for release on July 17, 2015, but was pushed back to March 25, 2016. The film starred Henry Cavill reprising his role as Clark Kent/Superman and many of the first film's cast return. Ben Affleck also joins the cast as Bruce Wayne/Batman, along with Jesse Eisenberg as Lex Luthor and Jeremy Irons as Alfred Pennyworth, among others.
 Darkseid's ending in Injustice 2 is an homage to "The Supergirl from Krypton" storyline as he captures Kara and brainwashes her to get revenge on Superman.

See also
 World's Finest
 Superman & Batman: Generations
 Superman/Batman: Public Enemies
 Superman/Batman: Apocalypse

References

External links
DC pages: S/B2003, B/S2013, B/S2019, B/SWF2022
Superman/Batman: Public Enemies Official Movie Site
The Continuity Pages: Justice League of America – Various Writers Era (2003 – Present)

2003 comics debuts
2011 comics endings
Superman titles
Batman titles
Team-up comics
Crossover comics
Comics by Brad Meltzer
Comics by Mark Waid